The thirteenth season of Australian reality television series The Block premiered on 30 July 2017 on the Nine Network. Both hosts Scott Cam (host) and Shelley Craft (Challenge Master) returned from the previous season, as did the three judges: Neale Whitaker, Shaynna Blaze and Darren Palmer.

Production
On 8 November 2016, The Block was renewed for a thirteenth season at Nine's upfronts.  Applications for the thirteenth season of the series opened on January 9, 2017, with energetic couples aged between 18 and 65 years old being sought by casting agents. Filming for the season is scheduled to occur between April 2017 and July 2017. The casting call also specifies first round couples will be reduced to final participants in the first week of filming, which suggests Season 13 will feature an elimination round similar to that of Season 5.

On 11 March 2017, it was reported that a vacant block of land at 46 Regent Street, Elsternwick, had been purchased for $9.6 million back in December 2016, with plans approved to build a five lot subdivision, meaning for the first time ever, they would be building a property from the ground up, instead of renovating an existing building. On 17 March 2017, it was officially confirmed that 46 Regent Street Elsternwick will be the location of The Block'''s thirteenth season with filming to begin on 27 April 2017, however they will not be building a property from the ground up, as five old rundown weatherboard houses are being relocated to the location, meaning this will be the first time since the sixth season the contestants will renovate a house.The Block’s open for inspection took place on Sunday, 15 October 2017. The Block auctions (or Block-tions) for the houses were held on Saturday, 28 October 2017. Elyse & Josh won the series with comedian Dave Hughes buying their property for over $3m.

Contestants
This is the fifth season of The Block to have five couples instead of the traditional four couples. Each team will renovate a house which have each been relocated from different suburbs around Melbourne.

Score history

Weekly Room Prize

Results
Judges' scores
 Colour key:
  Highest Score
  Lowest Score

Challenge scores

Domain Prize
Each week during the weekly walkthrough, Alice Stolz from Domain will judge each team's current room. She judges each room on suitability, continuity and flow, functionality, progress & budget. The weekly winner will be awarded a $5,000 weekly prize that is split equally in cash and marketing with domain. Each week the points are tallied and the team at the end with the highest score will have themselves and their property featured on the cover of Domain Magazine.

Auction

Ratings

Notes
Ratings data is from OzTAM and represents the live and same day average viewership from the 5 largest Australian metropolitan centres (Sydney, Melbourne, Brisbane, Perth and Adelaide).
In House 3 resided a secret vault of which the contents were unknown until it was opened. Whoever selected House 3 (Georgia & Ronnie) were able to open it and take ownership of the contents within. The vault contained $15,000 vouchers to Reece, Freedom Furniture, Neff & $5,000 in cash. The safe also included The Big Steal, which was two options, option 1 was to steal someone elses house & option 2 was to take the amount of money they spent on the 48 Hour challenge (which was $8,700) from another team. They chose option 2, to take money from another team, they took from Elyse & Josh.
The name of the house indicates the suburb the house use to belong to and was relocated from.
For this room, the teams were told they could make any room they'd like to, except for a bedroom. These are the rooms the teams chose to do:
Jason & Sarah - Second Living Room
Clint & Hannah - Second Living Room
Georgia & Ronnie - Second Living Room
Sticks & Wombat - Office Space
Elyse & Josh - Study Room
The original score of Jason & Sarah's Team Choice Room was 22, but lost a point due to Ronnie & Georgia prize in the previous room to take away one point from one team. The score was changed to 21.
The original winners would have been Ronnie & Georgia, but Elyse & Josh used an extra point they won in the "Bedroom Makeover Challenge" which ended them on the same score making them both the winning teams.
During the Master Suite Week, Jason & Sarah got well behind on their build and decided not to reveal a built room, as a result all the judges gave them zeroes, a first in The Block history. After results were revealed, they were told and warned that they need to complete the Master Suite whilst completing their Kitchen in the same week or they'll be kicked off The Block.
Before the comments from the judges for the kitchens were revealed, Scotty told Jason & Sarah that the judges loved their completed Master Suite and are able to continue being contestants on The Block''. Elyse & Josh initially got a score of 30, but due to a non-compliance issue with the gas cooktop each judge deducted 1/2 a point and Jason and Sarah were named winners and also received $10,000 cash.
The original score of Sticks & Wombats Hallway & Laundry was 27½, but they used a bonus point they won in the “Celebrity Cooking Challenge”. Their score was changed to 28½.
The original score of Jason & Sarah’s Backyard was 28, but because they didn’t include the cubby house from the “Cubby House Maze Challenge”, they were deducted 1 point. Their score was changed to 27.

References

2017 Australian television seasons
13